Evan King and Nathan Pasha were the defending champions but chose to defend their title with different partners. King partnered Fernando Romboli but lost in the first round to Robert Galloway and Hans Hach Verdugo. Pasha partnered Max Schnur but lost in the first round to Carlos Gómez-Herrera and Viktor Troicki.

Karol Drzewiecki and Gonçalo Oliveira won the title after defeating Orlando Luz and Rafael Matos 6–7(5–7), 6–4, [11–9] in the final.

Seeds

Draw

References

External links
 Main draw

Monterrey Challenger - Doubles